Fard or fardh is a cultivar of the palm date that is widely grown in Oman. It has black skin and small seeds. Fard dates ship well and do not tend to developed wrinkled skin.

See also
List of date cultivars
Dates in Oman (Arabic Wikipedia)

References

Date cultivars
Agriculture in Oman